Flight Around the World is a 1925 German silent adventure film directed by Willi Wolff and starring Ellen Richter, Reinhold Schünzel, and Bruno Kastner. It was released in two parts. It was shot at the Halensee Studios in Berlin. The film's sets were designed by the art directors Otto Erdmann and Hans Sohnle

Cast

References

Bibliography

External links

1925 films
Films of the Weimar Republic
Films directed by Willi Wolff
German silent feature films
1925 adventure films
German adventure films
UFA GmbH films
German black-and-white films
Silent adventure films
1920s German films
Films shot at Halensee Studios
1920s German-language films